This is a list of films banned in Singapore. This list includes films banned for screening in the country due to issues of virtue, either by law or by the Board of Film Censors (BFC). It also includes films that were previously banned but were eventually unbanned.

List

References 

Singapore
Film censorship in Singapore